Warren Carl Norwood (August 21, 1945 – June 3, 2005) was an American science fiction novelist, teacher, and musician.

Norwood was a member of Science Fiction and Fantasy Writers of America and was the author of 14 science fiction novels, most of them written during the 1980s.

When not writing, he was a longtime employee of Craig's Music in Weatherford, Texas. Norwood also taught writing at Weatherford College and Tarrant County College.

Military service and citations
A veteran of the Vietnam War, Warren received the Purple Heart, Bronze Star, and Army Commendation Medal.

Legacy
Upon his untimely death, his manuscripts and papers, consisting of 53 boxes of material, were transferred to the University of North Texas Special Collections department in Denton.

Death
Norwood died of liver disease and kidney failure in Weatherford, Texas on Friday, June 3, 2005 at the age of 59. He was survived by his wife Gigi Gephardt.

Bibliography
1982  An Image of Voices
1983  Fize of the Gabriel Ratchets
1983  Flexing the Warp
1983  The Seren Cenacles (with Ralph Mylius)
1984  Midway Between
1984  Planet of Flowers
1985  Polar Fleet
1986  Final Command
1987  Shudderchild
1988  Trapped
1988  True Jaguar
1988  Vanished
1989  Stranded
1989  Refugee (unpublished; there is an unedited draft of this novel at University of North Texas in Special Collections)

Series

The Double-Spiral War
Midway Between
Polar Fleet
Final Command

Time Police
Vanished
Trapped
Stranded
Refugee

The Windhover Tapes
An Image of Voices
Flexing the Warp
Fize of the Gabriel Ratchets
Planet of Flowers

References

External links

1945 births
20th-century American novelists
American male novelists
American science fiction writers
Novelists from Texas
2005 deaths
American male short story writers
20th-century American short story writers
20th-century American male writers